"Gangsta Party" is a song by Joe Budden, featuring Nate Dogg and produced by Scott Storch. It was supposed be the first single from Joe Budden's intended second album The Growth which was supposed to be released in June 2005. However the album had suffered numerous delays and was later shelved after a dispute with Def Jam.
 Continued disagreements between Budden and Def Jam forced the two sides to part ways.

Track listing
"Gangsta Party (Radio)"
"Gangsta Party (Dirty)"
"Gangsta Party (Instrumental)"

Charts

References

2005 singles
2005 songs
Joe Budden songs
Def Jam Recordings singles
Song recordings produced by Scott Storch
Songs written by Scott Storch
Songs written by Nate Dogg
Songs written by Joe Budden